UFC Fight Night: Edgar vs. Faber (also known as UFC Fight Night 66) was a mixed martial arts event held on May 16, 2015, at the Mall of Asia Arena in Pasay, Philippines.

Background
The event was the first that the organization has hosted in the Philippines. It took place in the metropolitan region of Manila, more precisely in Pasay.

The event was headlined by a featherweight bout between former UFC Lightweight champion Frankie Edgar and former WEC Featherweight champion Urijah Faber.

Luke Barnatt was expected to face Clint Hester at UFC Fight Night 63. However, Hester pulled out of the fight in early March due to a broken foot. Subsequently, Barnatt was pulled from the card entirely in favor of a matchup with Mark Muñoz at this event.

Roger Zapata was expected to face Li Jingliang at the event. However, on April 18, it was announced that Zapata was pulled from the fight due to undisclosed reasons. Jingliang faced Dhiego Lima.

Alex White was expected to face Mark Eddiva at the event. However, on April 26, it was announced that White was forced out of the fight due to an undisclosed injury. Eddiva faced promotional newcomer Levan Makashvili.

Royston Wee missed weight on his first attempt at the weigh ins, coming in at 137 lb and made no attempts to cut further. Instead, he was fined 20 percent of his fight purse, which went to Ning Guangyou.

Results

Bonus awards
The following fighters were awarded $50,000 bonuses:

Fight of the Night: Jon Delos Reyes vs. Roldan Sangcha-An
Performance of the Night: Neil Magny and Jon Tuck

See also
List of UFC events
2015 in UFC

References

UFC Fight Night
2015 in mixed martial arts
2015 in Philippine sport
Mixed martial arts in the Philippines
May 2015 sports events in the Philippines